Otto David Tolischus (November 20, 1890 – February 24, 1967) was a Prussian-Lithuanian-born journalist for the New York Times and winner of the 1940 Pulitzer Prize for Correspondence for his writing in Berlin during World War II.

Biography
Born in Russ, East Prussia, German Empire (after 1919  Memel Territory), he emigrated in 1907 to the United States. After working in factories, he attended the Columbia School of Journalism and joined the Cleveland Press after graduating in 1916, working his way up to managing editor. In 1923 he returned to Europe, working for Universal Service in Berlin until 1931 and for International News Service in London from 1931 to 1932 as chief correspondent.

After some time back in the US, he joined the Berlin bureau of the New York Times in 1933, where he chronicled the rise of Nazi Germany. Within two days of the secret signing of the Molotov–Ribbentrop Pact he had managed to get news of it for a page-one story called "Nazi Talks Secret" whose subtitle included "Soviet and Reich Agree on East."  On 26 August 1939, he filed a story that noted Nazi troops on the move near Gleiwitz (now Gliwice), which led to the Gleiwitz incident, a false flag operation, on 31 August 1939.  (On 28 August 1939, the Times was still reporting on fears of a Gleiwitz raid.) In 1940, he was expelled from Germany.  

Tolischus was assigned to Tokyo in January 1941. A few hours after the Japanese attack on Pearl Harbor that December, Tolischus was arrested and imprisoned for five months, where he was regularly beaten and tortured. During this period of imprisonment, the Japanese manager of the Times Tokyo Bureau, Junnosuke Ofusa, took food and clothes to Tolischus. The ongoing contact continued until Tolischus was sent to the United States as part of a prisoner exchange in 1942.

Tolischus was a member of the Times editorial board until his retirement in 1964. Tolischus died of cancer in 1967.

Works

Based on his experience as a journalist, Tolischus wrote three books on World War II: 
 1940 -- They Wanted War. New York: Reynal and Hitchcock.
 1943 -- Tokyo Record. New York: Reynald and Hitchcock.
 1945 -- Through Japanese Eyes. New York: Reynald and Hitchcock.

References

External sources
 Brown, John Mason. "Book Review: They Wanted War by Otto D. Tolischus," The American Political Science Review, Vol. 35, No. 3 (Jun., 1941), pp. 573–574.
 Clyde, Paul H., "Book Review: Through Japanese Eyes by Otto D. Tolischus," The American Political Science Review, Vol. 39, No. 4 (Aug., 1945), pp. 808–809.
 MacNair, Harley Farnsworth, "Book Review: Through Japanese Eyes by Otto D. Tolischus," The Pacific Historical Review, Vol. 15, No. 4 (Dec., 1946), pp. 465–466.
 Soward, F.H. "Book Review: Tokyo Record by Otto D. Tolischus," The Far Eastern Quarterly, Vol. 2, No. 4 (Aug., 1943), pp. 388–389.

1890 births
1967 deaths
People from Šilutė District Municipality
People from East Prussia
German people of Lithuanian descent
German emigrants to the United States
Pulitzer Prize for Correspondence winners
The New York Times Pulitzer Prize winners
Columbia University Graduate School of Journalism alumni